Mohini 9886788888 is a 2006 Indian Kannada-language horror drama film directed, co-produced and written by Rajendra Singh Babu. The film stars Aditya and Sadha, with Suhasini, Anu Prabhakar and Adi Lokesh in other prominent roles.

The film features original score and soundtrack from Hamsalekha. The film, upon release, met with average response at the box-office despite a high opening collection and the critical response was also average.

Cast

 Aditya as CID Officer Varun
 Sadha as Press Reporter Varsha
 Suhasini
 Anu Prabhakar
 Avinash 
 Rajesh Nataranga as Rajesh 
 Adi Lokesh as John 
 Komal Kumar
Bullet Prakash
 Hamsa Nandini as Mohini
 Nassar as Goolappa 
 Riyaz Khan as Vicky 
 K. S. L. Swamy
Mohan Juneja 
Vaijanath Biradar 
B. M. Giriraj 
Bank Suresh 
Vinod Varadaraj 
 Sriraksha Shivakumar 
 Baby Anughna
 Ramesh Pandit as Police officer

Soundtrack
The music of the film was composed and lyrics written by music composer Hamsalekha.

Reception 
A critic from Rediff.com wrote that "If you like horror movies, you will certainly like Mohini". A critic from Sify said the film was sans logic.

References

2006 films
2000s Kannada-language films
Indian horror drama films
Films scored by Hamsalekha
Films directed by Rajendra Singh Babu